

Results

North Eastern League Series 1

Final League table

North Eastern League Series 2

Final League table

North Eastern Cup

Mitchell Cup

References

AFC Heritage Trust

Aberdeen F.C. seasons
Aber